Louis de Pardaillan de Gondrin (15 February 1727 – 14 September 1757) was a French nobleman and great grandson of Madame de Montespan. He was styled the Marquis of Montespan. Born at Versailles, he was the only son of the Duke of Antin and Françoise Gillonne de Montmorency, herself a granddaughter of the maréchal de Luxembourg. He died unmarried and without children.

Ancestry

1727 births
1757 deaths
Marquesses of Montespan
Louis
French nobility
18th-century peers of France

Dukes of Antin